The 2014 Robert Morris Colonials football team represented Robert Morris University in the 2014 NCAA Division I FCS football season. They were led by first-year head coach John Banaszak and played their home games at Joe Walton Stadium. They were a member of the Northeast Conference. They finished the season 1–10, 1–5 in NEC play to finish in sixth place.

Schedule

Source: Schedule

References

Robert Morris
Robert Morris Colonials football seasons
Robert Morris Colonials football